Habib Kheder (born 17 August 1954) is a Tunisian handball player. He competed in the men's tournament at the 1976 Summer Olympics.

References

1954 births
Living people
Tunisian male handball players
Olympic handball players of Tunisia
Handball players at the 1976 Summer Olympics
Place of birth missing (living people)